John Schneebichler (23 July 1958 – 9 March 2020) was an Australian rules footballer who played for South Adelaide and Glenelg in the South Australian National Football League (SANFL).

References

External links 

1958 births
2020 deaths
South Adelaide Football Club players
Glenelg Football Club players
Australian rules footballers from South Australia
People from Adelaide
South Australian State of Origin players